Long Meadow Farm, also known as Plank House and Barn, is a historic home and barn located in New Hanover Township, Montgomery County, Pennsylvania.  The house is a -story, stuccoed brick Germanic-style residence with a -story addition.  The interior has Georgian-style details.  The barn dates to the mid-18th century.

It was added to the National Register of Historic Places in 1973.

References

Farms on the National Register of Historic Places in Pennsylvania
Georgian architecture in Pennsylvania
Houses in Montgomery County, Pennsylvania
National Register of Historic Places in Montgomery County, Pennsylvania